N,N′-Dimethyl-1,3-propanediamine (DMPA) is a chemical crosslinking reagent.

References

Diamines